Pig farming or pork farming or hog farming is the raising and breeding of domestic pigs as livestock, and is a branch of animal husbandry. Pigs are farmed principally for food (e.g. pork: bacon, ham, gammon) and skins.

Pigs are amenable to many different styles of farming: intensive commercial units, commercial free range enterprises, or extensive farming (being allowed to wander around a village, town or city, or tethered in a simple shelter or kept in a pen outside the owner's house). Historically, farm pigs were kept in small numbers and were closely associated with the residence of the owner, or in the same village or town. They were valued as a source of meat and fat, and for their ability to convert inedible food into meat and manure, and were often fed household food waste when kept on a homestead. Pigs have been farmed to dispose of municipal garbage on a large scale.

All these forms of pig farm are in use today, though intensive farms are by far the most popular, due to their potential to raise a large amount of pigs in a very cost-efficient manner. In developed nations, commercial farms house thousands of pigs in climate-controlled buildings. Pigs are a popular form of livestock, with more than one billion pigs butchered each year worldwide, 100 million in the United States. The majority of pigs are used for human food, but also supply skin, fat and other materials for use in clothing, ingredients for processed foods, cosmetics, and medical use.

Use as food
Almost all of the pig can be used as food. Preparations of pig parts into specialties include: sausage (and casings made from the intestines), bacon, gammon, ham, skin into pork scratchings, feet into trotters, head into a meat jelly called head cheese (brawn), and consumption of the liver, chitterlings, and blood (blood pudding or brown pudding).

Production and trade

Pigs are farmed in many countries, though the main consuming countries are in Asia, meaning there is a significant international and even intercontinental trade in live and slaughtered pigs.  Despite having the world's largest herd, China is a net importer of pigs, and has been increasing its imports during its economic development. The largest exporters of pigs are the United States, the European Union, and Canada. As an example, more than half of Canadian production (22.8 million pigs) in 2008 was exported, going to 143 countries. Older pigs will consume eleven to nineteen litres (three to five US gallons) of water per day.

Among meat animals, pigs have a lower feed conversion ratio than cattle, which can provide an advantage in lower unit price of meat because the cost of animal feed per kilogram or pound of resultant meat is lower. However, there are also many other economic variables in meat production and distribution, so the price differential of pork and beef at the point of retail sale does not always correspond closely to the differential in feed conversion ratios. Nonetheless, the favorable ratio often tends to make pork affordable relative to beef.

Relationship between handlers and pigs
The way in which a stockperson interacts with pigs affects animal welfare which in some circumstances can correlate with production measures. Many routine interactions can cause fear, which can result in stress and decreased production.

There are various methods of handling pigs which can be separated into those which lead to positive or negative reactions by the animals. These reactions are based on how the pigs interpret a handler's behavior.

Negative interactions
Many negative interactions with pigs arise from stock-people dealing with large numbers of pigs. Because of this, many handlers can become complacent about animal welfare and fail to ensure positive interactions with pigs. Negative interactions include overly heavy tactile interactions (slaps, punches, kicks, and bites), the use of electric goads and fast movements. It can also include killing them. However, it is not a commonly held view that death is a negative interaction. These interactions can result in fear in the animals, which can develop into stress. Overly heavy tactile interactions can cause increased basal cortisol levels (a "stress" hormone). Negative interactions that cause fear mean the escape reactions of the pigs can be extremely vigorous, thereby risking injury to both stock and handlers. Stress can result in immunosuppression, leading to an increased susceptibility to disease. Studies have shown that these negative handling techniques result in an overall reduction in growth rates of pigs.

"In Canada the Federal government does not regulate the treatment on farms and most provinces have animal cruelty legislation but they typically contain expectations for general agricultural practices."  Due to this lack of legislation, this perpetuates to the cruel treatment of swine. "The NFACC codes of practice are developed larger by the industry and are not enforced with third party oversight."

Positive interactions
Various interactions can be considered either positive or neutral. Neutral interactions are considered positive because, in conjunction with positive interactions, they contribute to an overall non-negative relationship between a stock-person and the stock. Pigs are often fearful of fast movements. When entering a pen, it is good practice for a stock-person to enter with slow and deliberate movements. These minimize fear and therefore reduce stress. Pigs are very curious animals. Allowing the pigs to approach and smell whilst patting or resting a hand on the pig's back are examples of positive behavior. Pigs also respond positively to verbal interaction. Minimizing fear of humans allow handlers to perform husbandry practices in a safer and more efficient manner. By reducing stress, stock are made more comfortable to feed when near handlers, resulting in increased productivity.

Impacts on sow breeding

Hogs raised in confinement systems tend to produce 23.5 piglets per year. Between 2013 and 2016, sow death rates nearly doubled in the United States, from 5.8 to 10.2 percent. 25 to 50 percent of deaths were caused by prolapse.

Other probable causes of death include vitamin deficiency, mycotoxins in feed, high density diets or abdominal issues. Iowa's Pork Industry Center collects mortality data in collaboration with the National Pork Board to collect data from over 400,000 sows from 16 U.S. states. The farms range in size and facility types. Increasing death rates are a profit concern to the industry, so money is invested into research to find solutions.

Genetic manipulation
Pigs were originally bred to rapidly gain weight and backfat in the late 1980s. In a more fat-conscious modern day America, pigs are now being bred to have less back fat and produce more offspring, which pushes the sow's body too far and is deemed one of the causes of the current prolapse epidemic. Researchers and veterinarians are seeking ways to positively impact the health of the hogs and benefit the hog business without taking much from the economy.

Terminology

Pigs are extensively farmed, and therefore the terminology is well developed:
Pig, hog, or swine, the species as a whole, or any member of it. The singular of "swine" is the same as the plural.
Shoat (or shote), piglet, or (where the species is called "hog") pig, unweaned young pig, or any immature pig
Sucker, a pig between birth and weaning
Weaner, a young pig recently separated from the sow
Runt, an unusually small and weak piglet, often one in a litter
Boar or hog, male pig of breeding age
Barrow, male pig castrated before puberty
Stag, male pig castrated later in life (an older boar after castration)
Gilt, young female not yet mated, or not yet farrowed, or after only one litter (depending on local usage).
Sow, breeding female, or female after first or second litter

Pigs for slaughter

Suckling pig, a piglet slaughtered for its tender meat
The maximum weight can vary between processors.
Grower, a pig between weaning and sale or transfer to the breeding herd, sold for slaughter or killed for rations.
Finisher, a grower pig over  liveweight
In some markets (Italy) the final weight of butcher pig is in the  range. They tend to have hind legs suitable to produce cured ham
Backfatter, cull breeding pig sold for meat; usually refers specifically to a cull sow, but is sometimes used in reference to boars

Groups
Herd, a group of pigs, or all the pigs on a farm or in a region
Sounder, a small group of pigs (or wild boar) foraging in woodland

Pig parts
 Trotters, the hooves of pigs (they have four hoofed toes on each foot, walking mainly on the larger central two)

Biology
In pig, pregnant
Farrowing, giving birth
Hogging, a sow when on heat (during estrus)

Housing

Sty, a small pig-house, usually with an outdoor run or a pig confinement
Pig-shed, a larger pig-house
Ark, a low semi circular field-shelter for pigs
Curtain-barn, a long, open building with curtains on the long sides of the barn. This increases ventilation on hot, humid summer days

Environmental and health impacts

Feces and waste often spread to surrounding neighborhoods, polluting air and water with toxic waste particles. Waste from swine on these farms carry a host of pathogens and bacteria as well as heavy metals. These toxins can leach down through the soil into groundwater, polluting local drinking water supplies. Pathogens can also become airborne, polluting the air and harming individuals when ingested. Contents from waste have been shown to cause detrimental health implications, as well as harmful algal blooms in surrounding bodies of water. Due to Concentrated Animal Feed Operations (CAFOs), those who live in the surrounding areas of pig farms tend to experience health complications. Symptoms included headaches, nausea, and weakness due to the fumes that are emitted from these farms. Those who work directly inside these farms often experience these symptoms more intensely. Typically, workers of these farms experience respiratory issues such as wheezing, coughing, and tightness of the chest as well as eye and nasal irritation. This is in part due to the air quality being poor because of the air particles being contaminated with hog feces.

Little to no regulation has been written by the EPA and federal legislators surrounding CAFOs to protect the welfare of both the environment and humans from their impacts. The only permit required by federal law on wastewater runoff by CAFOs is the National Pollutant Discharge Elimination System (NPDES) permit. NPDES are authorized under the Clean Water Act and aim to reduce dumping of pollutants in water systems. However, one of the most detrimental waste management practices used at swine farms, manure lagoons, have little to no regulations surrounding waste management, as they are not connected to a moving water source and therefore is not seen as an imminent threat to human or environmental health.

Geopolitical issues
As with other commodities, pork presents challenges in the politics of international trade as national interests compete and seek economic modus vivendi. Changes to policy can upset the existing balances, prompting economic anxiety. For example, in 2020, the hog farming sector in Taiwan was upset by a decision to allow imports from the United States without labeling of ractopamine use. Farmers' views varied on how negative the effects might be. Issues of pride and degree of autarky also figure into such debates; people understandably wonder whether trade competition changes will deeply damage domestic production capability, while accurate quantitative answers are often difficult to find amid the mass of debate.

Drugs

Growth promoters

Ractopamine
Most pigs in the US receive ractopamine which promotes muscle instead of fat, quicker weight gain,  and reduced costs and pollutants in the environment. Such pigs consume less feed to reach finishing weight and produce less manure. Ractopamine has not been approved for use by the European Union, China, Russia, and several other countries.

Colistin
China once used colistin (an antibiotic) as growth promoter (subtherapeutic antibiotic use) but discovered a colistin-resistant form of E. coli bacteria in a pig from a Shanghai farm in 2013. Investigations then led to the identification of "a gene called MCR-1 that allowed bacteria to survive colistin treatment in animals and humans." In 2016, these findings led China to ban colistin as growth promoter.

Antibiotics
A systematic review found that penicillins and tetracyclines were the most commonly used antibiotics in pigs.

Parasites
Toxoplasmosis is a constant pressure on pig farming. Worldwide, the percentage of pigs harboring viable Toxoplasma gondii parasites has been measured to be 3-71.43%. Surveys of seroprevalence (T. gondii antibodies in blood) are more common, and such measurements are indicative of the high relative seroprevalence in pigs across the world. Neonatal piglets have been found to suffer the entire range of severity, including progression to stillbirth. This was especially demonstrated in the foundational Thiptara et al. 2006, reporting a litter birth of three stillborns and six live in Thailand. This observation has been relevant not only to that country but to toxoplasmosis control in porciculture around the world.

Hygiene
Excessively hygienic raising conditions were found to prevent proper gut microbiota development by Schmidt et al. 2011. Moore et al. 1995 describes the pathology of Cryptosporidium infection, a common difficulty in piglet production.

In an attempt to curb diseases such as African swine fever, a number of Chinese companies have built condominium-style mega complexes multiple stories high to house thousands of pigs. The buildings have been dubbed "hog hotels" and come with strict protocols and advanced cleaning, veterinary, and disposal systems. However, doubt has been raised by policy specialists and animal scientists over the facilities' efficacy in preventing outbreaks. The welfare of the animals has also been a source of concern, and it has been suggested that the poor welfare of the pigs may cause a decline in their immunity.

See also

Boar–pig hybrid, Iron Age pig
Domestic pig
Exotic pet
Extensive farming
History of animal husbandry
Intensive farming
Intensive pig farming
List of pig breeds
Miniature pig
Pig toilet
Pig slaughter
Small Hog Operation Payment

Footnotes

Further reading
 J.L. Anderson, Capitalist Pigs: Pigs, Pork, and Power in America. Morgantown, WV: West Virginia University Press, 2019.
 

 
Livestock
Animal husbandry